Exeristeboda is a genus of moths belonging to the family Tortricidae.

Species
Exeristeboda chlorocosma (Turner, 1925)
Exeristeboda exeristis (Meyrick, 1910)

See also
List of Tortricidae genera

References

 , 2005: World Catalogue of Insects vol. 5 Tortricidae.

External links
tortricidae.com

Tortricini
Tortricidae genera
Taxa named by Józef Razowski